The Pouchel (also known as the Ladder Flea) is a single-seat ultralight aircraft designed by Daniel Dalby and produced by APEV. The aircraft was designed for amateur construction and first flown in 1999.

Design and development
The Pouchel I was conceived in 1997 by French engineer Daniel Dalby. The aim was to design an easy-to-build ultralight aircraft based on the formula, principles and writings of Henri Mignet. The core of the construction employed commercial aluminium ladders in the fuselage and as spars in both wings. The wings were assembled using styrofoam ribs, and were fabric-covered. It was powered by a Fuji engine, developing less than 15 hp. Controls were similar to Mignet Pou-du-Ciel designs, with a pivoting front wing and rudder, both operated by the control column via control rods and no foot pedals. After test hops and modifications, on 26 June 1999, Daniel Dalby piloted the Pouchel on its first true flight at Salon Eyguieres.

In 2002, after many plans had been sold to other amateur constructors, the ladder manufacturer refused to sell its products for this purpose, due to concerns about liability and insurance. A closely related aircraft in the same family is the APEV Demoichelle. Plans and kits are distributed by the APEV (Association pour la Promotion des Echelles Volantes, or in English, Association for the Promotion of Flying Ladders).

Variants

Bipouchel
tandem two-seater
HydroPouchel
the Pouchel seaplane, still at the prototype stage
Pouchel II
Version of the original Pouchel, but built without ladders
Pouchel Classic
with a fuselage made of wood
Pouchelec
with 12 kW electric motor, also at the prototype stage.
Pouchel Light
In 2012 the principal production version

Specifications (Pouchel Light)

External links
Official website of the APEV

References

Single-engined tractor aircraft
Pouchel
Tandem-wing aircraft
Homebuilt aircraft
Aircraft first flown in 1999